Amyema dolichopoda is a species of mistletoe in the family Loranthaceae native to Western Australia.

References

External links
Amyema dolichopoda occurrence data from the Australasian Virtual Herbarium

dolichopoda
Flora of Western Australia
Parasitic plants
Epiphytes
Taxa named by Bryan Alwyn Barlow
Plants described in 1982